IPG may refer to:

Immobilized pH gradient, a method used in isoelectric focusing
Impedance phlebography, a medical test
Implanted pulse generator (neurostimulator), a battery-powered device designed to deliver electrical stimulation to the brain
Independent Publishers Group, a book distributor
Interactive program guide, another name for an electronic program guide, a graphical user interface for cable TV boxes, satellite TV boxes, VCRs, DVRs and televisions which displays programming information 
Internet Press Guild an invitation-only group of journalists, editors and industry analysts
Interpacket gap (interframe gap), a networking term describing a part of total latency on a link
The Interpublic Group of Companies, a marketing and communications group
Intertape Polymer Group, a packaging products manufacturer
IPG Photonics, a fiber laser manufacturer
iPod games file extension